Global Change, Peace & Security (formerly Pacifica Review: Peace, Security & Global Change and Interdisciplinary Peace Research) is a triannual, peer-reviewed, academic journal covering international relations, security studies, and peace studies.

See also
 Journal of Peace Research

References

International relations journals